is a Japanese manufacturer of industrial sewing machines and domestic sewing machines, as well as high-technology SMT (surface mount technology) assembly equipment and is headquartered in Tama-shi, Tokyo. It is one of the leading industrial machine manufacturers. JUKI ranks as the no.1 sewing machine manufacturer in the world. Headquartered in Japan, the company currently has manufacturing facilities in Japan, China, and Vietnam, and markets its products on six continents, in about 170 countries.  Up until 1988, the company was known as Tokyo Juki Industrial Company, Ltd. The company motto, which doubles as a customer creed, is "Mind & Technology" (as in 'emotionally accessible technology').

Production

The company produces sewing machines for the home or hobbyist market. Today, JUKI is  one of the top manufacturers of computerized sewing machines competing with other well-known sewing brands such as Bernina International, Brother, Janome, and Singer. 

In February 2013, Juki and Sony Corp. entered negotiations to discuss a merger of their SMT equipment businesses. Since then, JUKI Corporation has successfully established themselves in the area of SMT assembly equipment around the world, with dedicated sales and service entities in key markets, such as Europe through JUKI Automation Systems GmbH, headquartered in Nuremberg, Germany and the Americas through JUKI Automation Inc, headquartered in Morrisville, North Carolina, USA.  

In October 2018, the company announced a cooperative project with Hitachi that uses IoT-based digital innovation to optimize manufacturing processes, improving the production of printed circuit boards by tracking inventory control and improving small lot production.

See also

SMT Placement Equipment

Notes and references

External links
 
 Juki Industrial sewing machines, Global Network
 Juki Household sewing machines, Subsidiary and Distributor list
Juki Surface Mount Technology Business in Europe (English and German)

Sewing machine brands
Manufacturing companies established in 1938
1938 establishments in Japan
Japanese brands
Manufacturing companies based in Tokyo
Textile machinery manufacturers